George William Lermond (November 29, 1904 – July 6, 1940) was an American long-distance runner. He competed in the men's 5000 metres at the 1924 Summer Olympics. A captain in the United States Army, he died in 1940 attempting to save his son in a house fire. He was buried at Arlington National Cemetery, after President Franklin Roosevelt gave his permission.

References

External links
 

1904 births
1940 deaths
Athletes (track and field) at the 1924 Summer Olympics
American male long-distance runners
Olympic track and field athletes of the United States
Place of birth missing
Burials at Arlington National Cemetery
Deaths from fire in the United States
Accidental deaths in Maryland
People from Nahant, Massachusetts
Sportspeople from Essex County, Massachusetts
Track and field athletes from Massachusetts
United States Army officers
Military personnel from Massachusetts
20th-century American people